Mildred is an unincorporated community in Pine River Township, Cass County, Minnesota, United States, near Pine River and Backus.

A post office was established at Mildred in 1899, and remained in operation until it was discontinued in 1954. The community was named for its first postmaster, Mrs. Mildred Schofield.

References

Unincorporated communities in Cass County, Minnesota
Unincorporated communities in Minnesota